Sérgio Jamur de Souza (born ) is a Brazilian futsal player who plays as a winger for Futbol Emotion Zaragoza and the Brazilian national futsal team. He is the cousin of fellow futsal player Mithyuê.

References

External links
Liga Nacional de Futsal profile
The Final Ball profile

1990 births
Living people
Brazilian men's futsal players